Their Darkest Hour: People Tested to the Extreme in WWII, is a book written by Laurence Rees which explores the stories of soldiers and civilians involved in the second world war. It examines the experiences of Western Allied soldiers during the war, as well as the experiences of Axis and Soviet soldiers. The stories are told in the format of short stories, between five and ten pages long, with the stories sub-categorised, displaced persons, POWs etc. Unlike other books written by Laurence Rees it is not a companion to a television series.

2008 non-fiction books
History books about World War II